Capeyorkia is a genus of spiders in the family Salticidae. It was first described in 2016 by Richardson. , it contains only one species, Capeyorkia vulpecula, found in Queensland. Its taxonomic relationships within the family are unknown.

References

Monotypic Salticidae genera
Spiders of Australia
Fauna of Queensland
Salticidae